John Pryor may refer to:

 John Pryor (soldier) (1750–1823), Continental Army officer
 John Benjamin Pryor (1812–1890), racehorse trainer
 John Arthur Pryor (1884–?), British officer and aristocrat

See also
 John Prior (disambiguation)